The 1985 Maharashtra State Assembly election was held in March 1985.  A total of 288 seats were contested.

List of participating political parties

Results

The Indian National Congress won the majority of seats. Shivajirao Patil Nilangekar became Chief Minister. Shankarrao Chimaji Jagatap became Speaker. Sharad Pawar became leader of the opposition.

Party results

!colspan=10|
|- align=center
!style="background-color:#E9E9E9" class="unsortable"|
!style="background-color:#E9E9E9" align=center|Political Party
!style="background-color:#E9E9E9" |No. of candidates
!style="background-color:#E9E9E9" |No. of elected
!style="background-color:#E9E9E9" |Seat change
!style="background-color:#E9E9E9" |Number of Votes
!style="background-color:#E9E9E9" |% of Votes
!style="background-color:#E9E9E9" |Change in vote %
|-
| 
|align="left"|Indian National Congress||287||161|| 25 (from INC(I) seats)||9,522,556||43.41%|| 1.09% (from INC(I) vote share)
|-
| 
|align="left"|Indian Congress (Socialist)||126||54|| 7 (from INC(U) seats)||3,790,850||17.28%|| 3.21% (from INC(U) vote share)
|-
| 
|align="left"|Janata Party||61||20|| 3||1,618,101||7.38%|| 1.23%
|-
| 
|align="left"|Bharatiya Janata Party||67||16|| 2||1,590,351||7.25%|| 2.13%
|-
| 
|align="left"|Peasants and Workers Party of India||29||13|| 4||825,949||3.77%|| 0.37%
|-
| 
|align="left"|Communist Party of India||31||2||||202,790||0.92%|| 0.39%
|-
| 
|align="left"|Communist Party of India (Marxist)||14||2||||174,350||0.79%|| 0.14%
|-
|
|54
|0
|
|220,230
|1.00%
| 0.24%
|-
| 
|align="left"|Republican Party of India (Khobragade)||16||0|| 1||113,632||0.52%|| 0.84%
|-
| 
|align="left"|Independents||1506||20|| 10||3,836,390||17.49%|| 9.46%
|-style="background-color:#E9E9E9"
|
|align="left"|Total||2230||288||||21,934,742||59.17%|| 5.87%
|-
|}

Regional results

Elected members

References

State Assembly elections in Maharashtra
1980s in Maharashtra
Maharashtra